Robert Archer Cooper (June 12, 1874August 7, 1953) was the 93rd Governor of South Carolina from January 21, 1919 to May 20, 1922.

Biography
Born in Waterloo Township, Laurens County, Cooper graduated with a law degree from Polytechnic Institute in San Germán, Puerto Rico. He was admitted to the bar in 1898 and practiced law in Laurens. In 1900, Cooper was elected to the South Carolina House of Representatives until 1904 when he was elected the solicitor of the Eighth Judicial Circuit of South Carolina.

Cooper entered the gubernatorial election of 1918 and won the general election without opposition to become the 93rd governor of South Carolina. He continued the progressive policies of his predecessor, Richard Irvine Manning III, by establishing a seven-month school term, mandating compulsory school attendance, expanding health care and improving the state roadways. These initiatives were paid for by stricter enforcement of existing tax laws and the revaluation of state property. Cooper was elected to a second term in 1920.

He resigned from the governorship in 1922 to accept an appointment to the Federal Farm Loan Board that lasted five years. After which, Cooper returned to the practice of law, but was called by President Franklin D. Roosevelt to serve as the General Counsel on the Commodity Credit Corporation. Roosevelt later appointed him in 1934 as Judge of the District Court for Puerto Rico, a position Cooper held until 1947. Cooper died on August 7, 1953, and was buried at the Laurens City Cemetery in Laurens.

His house at Laurens is included in the South Harper Historic District, added to the National Register of Historic Places in 1986.

References

Guillermo A. Baralt, History of the Federal Court in Puerto Rico: 1899-1999 (2004) (also published in Spanish as Historia del Tribunal Federal de Puerto Rico)

External links 
 SCIway Biography of Robert Archer Cooper
 NGA Biography of Robert Archer Cooper

1874 births
1953 deaths
People from Laurens County, South Carolina
Interamerican University of Puerto Rico alumni
South Carolina lawyers
Democratic Party members of the South Carolina House of Representatives
Democratic Party governors of South Carolina
University of South Carolina trustees
Judges of the United States District Court for the District of Puerto Rico
United States Article I federal judges appointed by Franklin D. Roosevelt
20th-century American judges
South Carolina state solicitors
People from Laurens, South Carolina
Expatriates from the United States in Spanish Puerto Rico